Dante Brown (born July 28, 1980) is a former American football running back who played one season with the Pittsburgh Steelers of the National Football League. He first enrolled at Middle Georgia College before transferring to the University of Memphis. He attended Swainsboro High School in Swainsboro, Georgia. Brown was also a member of the Cleveland Browns, Buffalo Bills and Seattle Seahawks.

Professional career
Brown was rated the 31st best running back in the 2003 NFL Draft by NFLDraftScout.com.

Pittsburgh Steelers
Brown signed with the Pittsburgh Steelers on April 29, 2003 after going undrafted in the 2003 NFL Draft. He made his NFL debut on November 14, 2004 against the Cleveland Browns, recording two rushing yards on one attempt. He was released by the Steelers on November 24, 2004.

Cleveland Browns
Brown was signed to the Cleveland Browns practice squad on November 30, 2004.

Buffalo Bills
Brown was signed to the Buffalo Bills active roster from the Cleveland Browns' practice squad on December 23, 2004. He was released by the Bills on May 17, 2005.

Seattle Seahawks
Brown signed with the Seattle Seahawks on August 10, 2005. He was released by the Seahawks on August 29, 2005.

References

External links
Memphis Tigers bio
College stats

Living people
1980 births
Players of American football from Cincinnati
American football running backs
African-American players of American football
Memphis Tigers football players
Pittsburgh Steelers players
21st-century African-American sportspeople
20th-century African-American people